Aimé Césaire is a station on line 12 of the Paris Métro. The station is located at Place Henri-Rol-Tanguy in Aubervilliers. It is named in honour of the French Martinican poet Aimé Césaire. It is the 307th station to open.

History 

After the death of Aimé Césaire in 2008, officials wanted to name a métro station after him. Jean-Christophe Lagarde, then the mayor of Drancy, proposed the name Proudhon-Gardinoux, although it was turned down by the RATP due to odonymic requirements for the naming of métro stations. STIF then decided to name it Front Populaire in 2011. On the other hand, the station that was temporarily named Pont de Stains, after a nearby bridge, was then given the name Aimé Césaire, with reference to the nearby square Aimé Césaire that was inaugurated on 6 July 2008.

The station opened as part of the 2.8km second phase of the extension of line 12 from Porte de la Chapelle to Mairie d’Aubervilliers on 31 May 2022. Front Populaire had already opened as part of the first phase on 18 December 2012, although the tunnels had already been completed until Mairie d’Aubervilliers. Construction of the stations in the second phase began in the fall of 2014 with its opening initially being scheduled for 2017, although it was eventually pushed back to mid-2019 then again to spring 2022 due to various administrative and technical problems as well as the COVID-19 pandemic. It is expected to handle around 15,000 passengers a day.

The exterior façade of the station features a frescos on glass panels, featuring excerpts from Césaire's work, such as illustrations, motifs, and quotes from his poems or past interviews, reflecting his favourite themes in his work: Martinique, Africa, and nature. It was produced by graphic designers Hermine Poitou and Catherine Félix. The station's accesses and surroundings were designed by Marc Aurel, with fine curves made of brass.

Passenger services

Access 
The station has 3 accesses:

 Access 1: Canal Saint-Denis
 Access 2: Pont de Stains
 Access 3: Boulevard Félix Faure

Station layout

Platforms 
The station has a standard configuration with 2 tracks surrounded by 2 side platforms.

Other connections 
The station is also served by lines 35, 45, and 139 of the RATP bus network.

Gallery

References

Paris Métro line 12
Paris Métro stations in Aubervilliers
Railway stations in France opened in 2022
Accessible Paris Métro stations